Brigadier-General John Middleton MP (1678 –1739) was a British Army officer and Scottish Whig politician who sat in the House of Commons almost continuously between 1713 and 1739.

Early life
He was born in Aberdeen in September 1678, being baptised on 27 September.

Middleton was the fourth (but first surviving) son and sixth child of Rev Prof George Middleton DD (1645-1726) and Janet or Jane Gordon, daughter of James Gordon of Seaton. He was grandson of Alexander Middleton (younger brother of John Middleton, 1st Earl of Middleton) and Margaret Gordon. Both Alexander and George Middleton served as Principal of King's College, Aberdeen. John's younger brother, Robert, was father of Charles Middleton, 1st Baron Barham. In about 1712, John Middleton married Elizabeth Cunningham, daughter of William Cunningham of Enterkin, Ayr.

Military career

Middleton obtained a commission in the Army in the reign of King William III, and was promoted to the rank of captain in 1706. He served in Spain in the War of the Spanish Succession, and also on board the fleet, where his company was employed as marines. He was many years an officer in the 25th Regiment of Foot, in which corps he rose to the rank of lieutenant-colonel, and he was promoted to the rank of colonel in 1711. He commanded the 25th Regiment in Scotland under the Duke of Argyll during the rebellion of the Earl of Mar, and in 1721 he was rewarded with the colonelcy of that corps. He commanded the 25th until 29 May 1732, when he was removed to the 13th Regiment of Foot. He was promoted to the rank of brigadier-general in 1735.

Political career

Middleton was closely attached to the Duke of Argyll from 1709 or before and followed the Duke's political affiliations. He was elected Member of Parliament (MP) for Aberdeen Burghs at the 1713 general election. At the 1715 general election he was defeated at the poll, but petitioned and was seated as Whig MP for Aberdeen Burghs on 22 July 1715. In 1717 he followed the Duke of Argyll into opposition and two years later followed him back to the government side. At the 1722 general election he was again defeated at the poll at Aberdeen and then seated on petition on 25 October 1722. He was returned unopposed in the general elections of 1727 and 1734 and remained MP until his death in 1739.

Middleton died in London of a "mortification of the bowels" on 4 May 1739, and was buried in Westminster (Abbey?). He left two sons and five daughters.

References

1678 births
1739 deaths
British Army generals
British MPs 1713–1715
British MPs 1715–1722
British MPs 1722–1727
British MPs 1727–1734
British MPs 1734–1741
King's Own Scottish Borderers officers
Members of the Parliament of Great Britain for Scottish constituencies
Somerset Light Infantry officers
British military personnel of the War of the Spanish Succession
People of the Jacobite rising of 1715